The 2003 Rally Catalunya (formally the 39th Rallye Catalunya - Costa Brava) was the thirteenth round of the 2003 World Rally Championship. The race was held over three days between 24 October and 26 October 2003, and was based in Lloret de Mar, Spain. Peugeot's Gilles Panizzi won the race, his 7th win in the World Rally Championship.

Background

Entry list

Itinerary
All dates and times are CEST (UTC+2) from 24 to 25 October 2003 and CET (UTC+1) on 26 October 2003.

Results

Overall

World Rally Cars

Classification

Special stages

Championship standings

Junior World Rally Championship

Classification

Special stages

Championship standings

References

External links 
 Official website of the World Rally Championship

Rally Catalunya
Rally Catalunya